Mikhail Andreevich Nazarov (born 14 October 1994) is a Russian ski jumper. He competed in two events at the 2018 Winter Olympics.

References

External links
 

1994 births
Living people
Russian male ski jumpers
Olympic ski jumpers of Russia
Ski jumpers at the 2018 Winter Olympics
Ski jumpers at the 2022 Winter Olympics
Place of birth missing (living people)